Lieutenant Colonel Malcolm Stephen Osler,  (19 March 1919 – 22 September 1971) was a South African flying ace of the Second World War, credited with 12 aerial victories.

Military career
Osler joined the South African Permanent Force in 1938 after attending a TATS pupil pilot training scheme. He joined 1 Squadron SAAF in June 1941 and assumed command of the squadron 6 months later. He returned to South Africa and commanded 6 Squadron SAAF before attending a Military College Staff course. He served briefly as an instructor before joining 145 Squadron. On 29 April 1944 he was promoted to lieutenant colonel and awarded a Bar to his Distinguished Flying Cross. He then took command of No. 601 Squadron RAF before serving with 1 MORU and 5 SAAF Wing before being demobilised.

Osler died suddenly on 22 September 1971.

References

1919 births
1971 deaths
South African World War II flying aces
Recipients of the Distinguished Flying Cross (United Kingdom)
People from Benoni